Hamza Massoudi (born 24 January 2000) is a Belgian footballer.

Personal life
Born in Belgium, Massoudi is of Moroccan descent.

References

Living people
2000 births
Footballers from Brussels
Belgian footballers
Belgian sportspeople of Moroccan descent
Association football midfielders
Standard Liège players
Sint-Truidense V.V. players
Belgian Pro League players